Rocio Rivarola Trappe (born 2 July 1987 in Asunción) is a female Paraguayan rower. Rivarola qualified for the women's single sculls at the 2004 Summer Olympics in Athens by achieving a fifth spot from FISA Latin American Qualification Regatta in San Salvador, El Salvador with an entry time of 8:25.81. Rowing in the D-Final, Rivarola paddled her stretch against five other women to overhaul an eight-minute barrier for a third-place effort and twenty-first overall in a lifetime best of 7:57.36. Building a historic milestone for Paraguay, Rivarola became the youngest and first ever female athlete as the nation's flag bearer in the opening ceremony.

Notes

References

External links
 
 

1987 births
Living people
Paraguayan female rowers
Rowers at the 2004 Summer Olympics
Olympic rowers of Paraguay
Sportspeople from Asunción
21st-century Paraguayan women